Islamabad Union is a union of Eidgaon Upazila, Cox's Bazar District, Bangladesh.

History 

The Greater Eidgaon Union was demolished in 1990 in the union of Islampur Union, Islamabad Union and Jalalabad Union *Eidgaon.

Geography 
The total areesize of Islamabad Union is 2726 acres (11.03 km2)

Location of Islamabad Union in Eidgaon Upazila. The distance of the union from the upazila headquarters is about 27 km. Eidgaon Union and Jalalabad Union on the south, Pokhkhali Union on the west, Islampur Union, Eidgaon Upazila, Islampur Union and Chakaria Upazila Khutakhali Union and formerly Ramu Upazila Eidgar Union is located.

Naming 

Under the name of renowned Landlord and donor of the area, Nurul Islam Chowdhury (Bedar Miah), the union was named "Islamabad".

Administrative structure 
The Islamabad Union Parishad under  Eidgaon Upazila. The administrative activities of the union are under the Eidgaon Upazila. This is a part of the union Cox's Bazar-3 Constituency constituency of the Jatiya Sangsad and the constituency of Cox's Bazar-3 of 296 constituencies.

The Villages of the Ward-based Union are

Education 
Islamabad Union's literacy rate is 32.10%. There are 1 secondary school high school, 2 dakhil madrasa, 1 lower secondary school and 12 primary schools in the union.

Institutions 
 Secondary school
 Jahan Ara Islam Girl High School

 Madrasa;
 Islamabad Nurul Haque Dakhil Madrasa
 Aji Lutful Kabir Adarsha Balika Dakhil Madrasa
 Momtazul Ulum Faridiya Dakhil Madrasa

Lower secondary school
 Eidgah International Residential School and College

Primary school
 Yusuferkhil Government Primary School
 Ichakhali Government Primary School
 Eidgah Charpara Yakub Ali Government Primary School
 Eidgon Tekpara Government Primary School
 North Lorabak Sikdarpara Government Primary School
 Wahederpara Government Primary School
 Gazalia Government Primary School
 West Gazalia Government Primary School
 East Boalkhali Azimuddin Government Primary School
 Pahasiyakhali Government Primary School
 Boalkhali Faujul Karim Government Primary School
 Haripur Ardhendhu registered private primary school

River and canals 
 is flowing through the southern end of Islamabad Union.

People's representatives 
 Present Chairman: Mohammad Noor Siddique

People's representatives list

List of Chairman

See also
 Islamabad Union
 Eidgaon Upazila
 Union of Cox's Bazar districts

References

Unions of Cox's Bazar District